Asian Affairs, the journal of the Royal Society for Asian Affairs, has been published continuously since 1914 (originally as the Journal of the Central Asian Society, and from 1931 to 1969 as the Journal of the Royal Central Asian Society). It covers a range of social, political, and historical subjects linked to Asia, with a particular focus on current affairs and more recent history. It also is a major source of book reviews. The Journal provides a forum at the interface between learned interest, scholarship, journalism and personal experience. There are also two magazines called Asian Affairs, one published for the past decade or so from Hong Kong, and another from Delhi. It has recently published special issues in collaboration with the Wilson Centre for Scholars in Washington DC and King's College London. 

In the Norwegian Scientific Index, the journal has been listed as "Level 0" since 2005, which indicates the journal is non-academic and publications in the journal do not count for public research funding.

References

External links
 https://web.archive.org/web/20061231112905/http://www.tandf.co.uk/journals/titles/03068374.asp
Link to Journal Website at Taylor and Francis

Publications established in 1914
Asian studies
Routledge academic journals
Triannual journals